The Harrisonburg Metropolitan Statistical Area is a Metropolitan Statistical Area (MSA) in Virginia as defined by the United States Office of Management and Budget (OMB). As of the 2020 census, the MSA had a population of 135,571 (though a July 1, 2021 estimate placed the population at 135,824).

MSA components
Note: Since a state constitutional change in 1871, all cities in Virginia are independent cities that are not located in any county. The OMB considers these independent cities to be county-equivalents for the purpose of defining MSAs in Virginia.

One county and one independent city are included in the Harrisonburg Metropolitan Statistical Area.

Counties
Rockingham
Independent Cities
Harrisonburg

Communities

Incorporated places
Bridgewater
Broadway
Dayton
Elkton
Grottoes (partial)
Harrisonburg (Principal city)
Mount Crawford
Timberville

Census-designated places
Note: All census-designated places are unincorporated.
Massanutten

Other unincorporated places

Independent city 
As an independent city, Harrisonburg is not a part of Rockingham County, despite its status as the county seat.

Demographics
As of the census of 2000, there were 108,193 people, 38,488 households, and 25,337 families residing within the MSA. The racial makeup of the MSA was 92.19% White, 3.07% African American, 0.15% Native American, 1.35% Asian, 0.02% Pacific Islander, 1.82% from other races, and 1.42% from two or more races. Hispanic or Latino of any race were 5.36% of the population.

The median income for a household in the MSA was $35,349, and the median income for a family was $45,711. Males had a median income of $30,285 versus $22,403 for females. The per capita income for the MSA was $16,847.

See also
List of U.S. Metropolitan Statistical Areas in Virginia
Virginia census statistical areas

References

 
Geography of Rockingham County, Virginia
Harrisonburg, Virginia